is a Japanese manga series written and illustrated by Tsunomaru and serialized in Weekly Shōnen Jump. It was also adapted into an anime series.

Plot
Midori Makibaō is a small white mule. Compared to the other thoroughbred horses, his physical size comparable to a donkey with wide nostrils. However, with guts and speed as his weapons, Makibaō wins in every big race.

At the beginning of his career, Makibaō has trouble making his debut as a racehorse. But he has reasons to overcome his difficulties; a lifelong rival horse called Superhorse Cascade, that Makibaō needs to defeat. Plus, he is determined to win back his mother, Midori, a horse that had been taken away to pay debts.

There are many hardships that Makibaō has to overcome, but he thrives in a series of races to become a great racehorse.

Characters
Horses
  
  
  
  
  
  
  
  
  
  
 
  
 
  
  
 
 Fried Chicken 

Other
 Akira Ishida as Wakazou
 Kenichi Ogata as Genjirou
 Minami Takayama as Katsu
 Shigeru Chiba as Chuubei
 Takeshi Watabe as Nobuhiko Horie

Episodes
 生まれてオドロいた! Being born, Makibao it was!
 うんこたれ蔵! The Burrito it is densely to droop, the warehouse!
 鬼の調教師! Tamer of Orge!
 カスケード登場! Cascade Appearance!
 だめになる! It Becomes Useless!
 立つんだ たれ蔵! It Stands, It Is the Flap Warehouse Which Is!
 誰がのるの?! Someone Rides?!
 みどり牧場の王様 The King of the Green Ranch
 強くなるぞっ!! It Becomes Strong, Scared!!
 嵐のデビュー!! Debut of storm!!
 つっこめ! たれ蔵!! Thrust! Flap Warehouse!!
 どっちが強いの!? Either One is Strong!?
 黒い殺し屋!  Black Killer!
 甘ったれるな〜!! Do not be Over-Reliant!!
 もう迷わない! No More Hesitations!!
 はかったな!! Unmeasurable!!
 けちらせ! 泥んこ!! Kick Away! Mud!!
 行け!! バレリーナ作戦  Let's Go!! Ballerina Operation
 カスケードデビュー!! Cascade's Debut!!
 魔のトライアングル Magical Triangle
 根性200%!! Spirit 200%!!
 ハハキトク
 試練の雨! 朝日杯の朝!!  Rain Trial! Morning of Asahi Cup!!
 1600Mのサバイバル!! 1600 m Survival!!
 三強激走!! 勝つのは?! Competition among the Strongest Three!! Who is the Winner?!
 勝負あり?! 菅助涙のムチ!! To the White Meadows, Mongolia!
 白い草原、モンゴルへ! A Man-to-man Fight in the Wilderness
 原野の一騎討ち!! Awakened!! Wild Power!!
 目覚めろ!! 野生の力!! Awake!! Power of Wildness!!
 たれ蔵・命がけの疾走!! Strong Attack!! The Death Fight of Wrath!!
 猛突進!! 怒りの死闘!! Devil's Lucky House
 悪魔のラッキーホース Foul! Ro's Determination!!
 反則あり! アローの執念!! Duel! Dangerous Race!!
 対決! 危険なレース!! Clash!! The Wounded Spirit!!
 激突!! 傷だらけの根性!! Two Traps! Start of Competition!!
 2つの罠! 皐月賞スタート!! A White Miracle!!
 起こせ!! 白い奇跡!! Tremble!! The Invisible Enemy!!
 戦慄!! 見えない敵!! Fierce Battle!! Japan's Derby!!
 激闘!! 日本ダービー!!  Reach out to Japan's Goal!!
 届け!! へ日本一のゴール!! Report!! To the goal of Japan one!!
 母を訪ねてばんえい競馬 Visiting the Mother
 宿敵・ヒゲ親子の野望 It is to be to obtain, Challenge from ambitious Makibao of the horse racing
 マキバコからの挑戦! Inn Enemy with Parent and Child!
 さらばおかーちゃん!! Good-bye -!!
 山奥の秘密特訓!! Secret intensive training of Mountain Inner Part!!
 異変?! たれ蔵大変身?! Accident?! Flap Warehouse Large Transformation?!
 発走!! 決意の菊花賞!! Start!! Chrysanthemum flower prize of Determination!!
 先手必勝!! 菅助の大勝負!! Helper certain victory!!  Help large game!!
 崩壊!! 黒い帝王伝説!!
 新コーチ・ツァビデル!!
 激突!! 決戦の有馬記念!!
 命がけのラストスパート!!
 注げ全力!! 最後の決着!!
 はらぺこ! たれ蔵裁判 (This is the only episode not included as part of the 15-tape rental VHS set released 1998-10-18 by Pony Canyon.)
 アメリカのマキバオー!!
 とらわれのマキバコ!!
 発見?! 幻の最強馬!!
 恐怖のマグネット作戦!!
 大暴れ!! アマゾン脱出!!
 史上最大のレース!!
 走れ!! 世界のマキバオー!!

Production staff
 Director: kirigaya
 Series Composition: Hiroshi Hashimoto

Theme songs
Opening theme
  by FMAP
Ending theme
  by MEN'S 5

See also
 List of fictional horses

References

External links
 Studio Pierrot website 
 

1994 manga
1996 anime television series debuts
Comedy anime and manga
Fictional horses
Horse racing in anime and manga
Fuji TV original programming
Pierrot (company)
Seinen manga
Shōnen manga
Shueisha franchises
Shueisha manga
Tomy games
Winners of the Shogakukan Manga Award for children's manga